Sopha may refer to:

People

Elmer Sopha (1924-1982), Canadian politician from Ontario
Eric Nelson Sopha (born in 1974), Seychellois footballer
Sirichok Sopha (born in 1967), Thai politician

First name
Sopha Saysana (born in 1992), Laotian footballer

Others
Namtok Kaeng Sopha, waterfall in Phitsanulok Province, Thailand
Kaeng Sopha, subdistrict in Phitsanulok Province, Thailand